The Lancia Gamma (Tipo 830) is an executive car (E-segment in Europe) manufactured and marketed by the Lancia subdivision of Fiat. Following its debut at the 1976 Geneva Motor Show as Lancia's new flagship, the Gamma was marketed as 4-door fastback saloon as the  Berlina (1976-1984) and as 2-door coupé (1977-1984), both designed by Pininfarina — with 15,272 and 6,790 manufactured, respectively. The Gamma superseded the Lancia Flavia.

The fastback style of the Berlina featured a conventional boot at the rear, rather than a hatchback. At the car's press launch Pininfarina said a hatchback was avoided to save the inconvenience to back seat passengers when luggage is loaded, ostensibly draughts.

The name 
Gamma is the third letter of the Greek alphabet. Lancia had used Greek letters to denote its models before 1945, and the nomenclature was revived with the Lancia Beta in 1971, the first Lancia developed under Fiat supervision. The Gamma is also shared front-wheel drive and suspension elements from the Beta.  The Gamma carries the γ (lower case gamma) emblem both inside and out.

Engines 
The Lancia Gamma was a front-wheel drive car with longitudinally-mounted boxer engine and with either a 5-speed manual transmission and later a 4-speed automatic transmission. The Gamma received a midcycle face-lift, receiving Bosch L-Jetronic fuel injection as well as a new corporate grille, 15-inch "sunburst" alloy wheels, and a revised interior with new instrumentation, interior lighting, badging, handbrake and gear lever gaiter.

Though Fiat had planned to use one of their V6 engines, Lancia developed unique flat-4 engines for the Gamma. The Lancia Flavia and Flavia Coupe had used 1.8 and 2.0 litre flat four engines and the Lancia 2000 used the 2.0 litre engine. Engine designer De Virgilio also drew up an engine for the Gamma which was a V6 4-cam with either 3- or 4-litre displacement, but this never came to fruition.  

The flat engine, though large for a modern 4-cylinder petrol engine, lacked the cachet associated with six and eight cylinder engines but enabled Pininfarina chief stylist Aldo Brovarone to lower the coupé's bonnet line and to steeply rake its windscreen.  

Pressure cast in alloy with wet cylinder liners, the engine was light and though it only produced , ( in 2.0-litre form) its torque was available at just 2000 rpm.

Initially available with a displacement of 2.5 L (Gamma 2500), it was later joined by a 2.0 L version (Gamma 2000), which resulted from the Italian tax system (cars with engines larger than 2.0 L were subject to heavier tax burden). The displacement was lowered by decreasing the bore rather than the stroke of the engine. Both displacements were using Weber carburetors, and the 2.5 L also came in a version fitted with fuel injection (Gamma 2500 I.E.)
 2.0 L carburetor 8v SOHC flat-4 - 1999 cc, 120 PS (1st series) 115 PS (2nd series) (85 kW)
 2.5 L carburetor 8v SOHC flat-4 - 2484 cc, 140 PS (103 kW)
 2.5 L I.E. 8v SOHC flat-4 - 2484 cc, 140 PS (103 kW)

*stated by Pininfarina production records

Concepts 

Several concepts were developed from the Gamma Platform over the years:
 1977 Pininfarina Gamma Spider — a targa top version of coupé.
 1977 Giugiaro Megagamma — a short-nosed MPV (multi-purpose vehicle) hatchback-bodied variant.
 1980 Pininfarina Gamma Scala — a saloon, based on the coupé but with a regular notchback boot.
 1981 Saloon — a Berlina-based six-window three-box, notchback saloon variant.
 1982 Pininfarina Gamma Olgiata — a three-door shooting brake, based on the coupé; similar in concept to the Lancia Beta HPE.

Gallery

References

External links 

 Italian website on Lancia Gamma
 Lancisti.net - An Information Exchange and Support Community for Lancia Owners and Enthusiasts
 Gamma Consortium 
 Lancia Motor Club (UK)

1980s cars
Cars introduced in 1976
Coupés
Front-wheel-drive vehicles
Executive cars
Gamma
Sedans
Cars powered by boxer engines
Lancia Gamma
Flagship vehicles